Paul Langley (born 9 February 1972) is an Australian table tennis player. He competed in the men's singles event at the 1996 Summer Olympics.

References

External links
 

1972 births
Living people
Australian male table tennis players
Olympic table tennis players of Australia
Table tennis players at the 1996 Summer Olympics
Sportspeople from Adelaide